It's Alright (I See Rainbows) is the sixth solo album by Yoko Ono, and her second release after the death of husband John Lennon. As a variation of a theme concerning its predecessor, the back cover features a transparent image of Lennon in a then-contemporary photo of Yoko and Sean, depicted in Central Park. This album, released in 1982, marked Ono's first foray into new wave sounds and 1980s pop production. All songs were written, composed, arranged, produced, and sung by Ono. It charted at #98 in the US.

Background
The album saw Yoko take her music in a more uplifting direction following 1981's Season of Glass. Yoko reflected on the making of the album when writing liner notes for the 1992 boxset Onobox:

In 1997, the album was remastered by Ono and Rob Stevens for release on CD by Rykodisc. The 1997 release used newly remixed versions of all songs. Some of the original mixes had a CD release in 1992 on the Onobox set but the rest remain unreleased on CD to date.

Reception
Billboard called it Ono's "most commercially accessible musical effort."

Track listing
All songs written by Yoko Ono.

Personnel
Yoko Ono – vocals
Paul Griffin – keyboards, synthesizer, piano
Pete Cannarozzi – synthesizer
Gordon Grody, Kurt Yahjihan, Carlos Alomar – background vocals
Elliott Randall, Steve Love, Hugh McCracken, John Lennon, John Tropea – guitar
Michael Holmes, Paul Shaffer – keyboards
Neil Jason, Tony Levin, Wayne Pedziwiatr – bass guitar
Yogi Horton, Allan Schwartzberg – drums
Rubens Bassini, David A. Freedman, Sammy Figueroa, Roger Squitero – percussion
Badal Roy – tabla
Howard Johnson – baritone saxophone, tuba
Technical
Brian McGee, John Davenport, Jon Smith – engineer
Bob Gruen – photography

Charts

Release history

References

1982 albums
Yoko Ono albums
Rykodisc albums
Albums produced by Yoko Ono